Jennifer Anne Nielsen (born July 10, 1971) is an American author known primarily for young adult fiction.  Her works include the Ascendance Series, Behind Enemy Lines (one of the books in the Infinity Ring series), The Mark of the Thief, A Night Divided, and the Underworld Chronicles.

Life 
Nielsen was born and raised in northern Utah and completed her first full manuscript, on picking locks, at the age of 11. However, it was abandoned when a locksmith did not allow her to research picking locks. She published Elliot and the Goblin War, the first Underworld Chronicles book, in 2010 and has continued publishing novels since.

In 2013, she won the Whitney Award for Best Middle Grade Novel for The False Prince, the first novel in the Ascendance Trilogy, and the next year she won again in the same category for The Runaway King, its sequel. The paperback reprint of The False Prince put her on the New York Times Best Seller List in March 2013. The False Prince received a starred review from Publishers Weekly.

Nielsen lives in Northern Utah and is a practicing member of the Church of Jesus Christ of Latter-Day Saints.

Selected works

The Ascendance series

 
 
 
The Captive Kingdom. Scholastic, Inc. 2020. 
The Shattered Castle. Scholastic, Inc. 2021. ISBN 9781338275902

Traitor's Game series 

 
 
The Warrior's Curse. Scholastic Press. 2020 .

Mark of the Thief series

References

Further reading 
Article in Publishers Weekly

External links

 
 
Official website

American writers of young adult literature
American fantasy writers
Novelists from Utah
Living people
Place of birth missing (living people)
1971 births
American women novelists
21st-century American novelists
21st-century American women writers
Women science fiction and fantasy writers
American women children's writers
American children's writers
Women writers of young adult literature
Latter Day Saints from Utah